São Pedro do Turvo is a municipality in the state of São Paulo in Brazil. The population is 7,696 (2020 est.) in an area of 731 km². The elevation is 457 m.

References

Municipalities in São Paulo (state)